Lovasberény is a village in Fejér county, Hungary.

External links 

 Street map 

Populated places in Fejér County